Aartsenia candida is a species of sea snail, a marine gastropod mollusk in the family Pyramidellidae, the pyrams and their allies. The species is one of the two species within the Aartsenia genus, with the exception of the other related species being Aartsenia arctica.

Distribution
This species occurs in the following locations:
 European waters (ERMS scope)
 North West Atlantic

Notes
Additional information regarding this species:
 Distribution: southern Gaspe waters (Baie des Chaleurs, Gaspe Bay to American, Orphan and Bradelle banks; eastern boundary: eastern Bradelle Valley)
 Habitat: circalittoral of the Gulf and estuary

References

External links
 To CLEMAM
 To Encyclopedia of Life
 To World Register of Marine Species

Pyramidellidae
Gastropods described in 1842